Capital punishment is a legal penalty in Burkina Faso. It has been abolished for all offenses except war crimes, making the country "Abolitionist for Ordinary Crimes," along with Brazil, Chile, El Salvador, Guatemala, Israel, and Peru. Before the partial abolition of capital punishment in 2018, capital punishment had been abolished de facto. Its last execution was performed in 1989.

References

Burkina Faso
Law of Burkina Faso